Stephen Holmes (born February 21, 1948) is the Walter E. Meyer Professor of Law at New York University.

He received a B.A. in 1969 from Denison University and a Ph.D. in 1976 from Yale University, where he won the John Addison Porter Prize for that year.  After joining faculty at the University of Chicago as an Associate Professor of Political Science in 1985, Holmes became a tenured Professor of Political Science and Law at the university's law school in 1989. He joined the faculty at Princeton University from 1997-2000 as a Professor of Politics before his present post.

Media commentary 
In 2004, he was interviewed in the BBC documentary The Power of Nightmares - The Rise Of The Politics Of Fear.

Selected publications
Benjamin Constant and the Making of Modern Liberalism (1984, Yale University Press) - on Benjamin Constant, translated into French 
The Anatomy of Antiliberalism (1993, Harvard University Press) - translated into German, Italian and Chinese
Passions and Constraint: On the Theory of Liberal Democracy (1995, University of Chicago Press) - translated into Italian
 The Cost of Rights: Why Liberty Depends on Taxes (1999, with Cass R. Sunstein, Norton)- translated into Italian, Polish and Chinese
The Matador’s Cape: America’s Reckless Response to Terror (2007, Cambridge University Press)
The Light that Failed. A Reckoning (2019, with Ivan Krastev, Allen Lane/Penguin) - on illusionary expectations of liberalism translated into German

References

External links
Stephen Holmes at NYU School of Law
 Retrieved 17 August 2013
 Retrieved 17 August 2013

Living people
Yale University alumni
New York University faculty
American political scientists
1948 births